John 'Keith' Moffat (born 1943) is Louis Block Professor of Biochemistry and Molecular Biology and former Deputy Provost for Research at the University of Chicago. He currently heads BioCARS at Argonne National Laboratory, where he worked on the Advanced Photon Source. He is most noted for his contributions to Time resolved crystallography. He is a former Guggenheim Fellow and former Cornell University faculty member. He has a Ph.D. from King's College, Cambridge under the Nobel laureate Max Perutz at MRC-LMB and an undergraduate degree from the University of Edinburgh. He is married with an adopted son.

Selected publications

See also
 List of Guggenheim Fellowships awarded in 1985
 List of University of Chicago faculty
 List of University of Cambridge people
 List of University of Edinburgh people
 List of Cornell University faculty

References

External links
 
 Keith Moffat publications on ResearchGate

University of Chicago faculty
Living people
Cornell University faculty
Alumni of King's College, Cambridge
Alumni of the University of Edinburgh
American biophysicists
1943 births
People from Chicago
Scientists from Edinburgh
People educated at the Royal High School, Edinburgh